The following is a list of the 535 communes of the Gironde department of France.

The communes cooperate in the following intercommunalities (as of 2020):
Bordeaux Métropole
Communauté d'agglomération du Bassin d'Arcachon Nord
Communauté d'agglomération Bassin d'Arcachon Sud
Communauté d'agglomération du Libournais
Communauté de communes du Bazadais
Communauté de communes de Blaye
Communauté de communes Castillon-Pujols (partly)
Communauté de communes Convergence Garonne
Communauté de communes des Coteaux Bordelais
Communauté de communes du Créonnais
Communauté de communes de l'Estuaire
Communauté de communes du Fronsadais
Communauté de communes du Grand Cubzaguais
Communauté de communes du Grand Saint-Émilionnais
Communauté de communes Jalle Eau Bourde
Communauté de communes Latitude Nord Gironde
Communauté de communes Médoc Atlantique
Communauté de communes Médoc Cœur de Presqu'île
Communauté de communes Médoc Estuaire
Communauté de communes Médullienne
Communauté de communes de Montesquieu
Communauté de communes du Pays Foyen (partly)
Communauté de communes des Portes de l'Entre-Deux-Mers
Communauté de communes du Réolais en Sud Gironde
Communauté de communes rurales de l'Entre-Deux-Mers
Communauté de communes du Secteur de Saint-Loubès
Communauté de communes du Sud Gironde
Communauté de communes du Val de l'Eyre

References

Gironde